The Fire Station Inn, also known as the North Adelaide Fire Station, at 82 Tynte Street, is a historic fire station building in North Adelaide, South Australia.

It was built as a shop in 1866. It was renovated to serve as a fire station in 1904.  As of 2018, it is used as tourist accommodation.

It was listed as a State Heritage Place on the South Australian Heritage Register on 11 September 1986.

References

Defunct fire stations in Australia
South Australian Heritage Register
North Adelaide
Former buildings and structures in South Australia